Hansom is a surname. Notable people with the surname include:

 Charles Francis Hansom (1816–1888), an English architect
 Joseph Hansom (1803–1882), an English architect and inventor
 Edward Joseph Hansom (1842–1900), an English architect

Surnames